Salvia lemmonii (Lemmon's sage) is an aromatic species of sage that is native to the United States and Mexico.

Description
The long, tubular flowers are deep pink to crimson with a projecting upper lip and a wide, down-turned lower lip. These appear in clusters on the ends of stems between July and October (mid summer to mid spring)  in their native range.

Range and Habitat
Salvia lemmonii species occurs in mountains in dry woodland in Northwestern Mexico, southern Arizona and New Mexico, usually in canyons or on rocky slopes. Research grade observations at iNaturalist range from 1200 to 2800 meters in elevation.

References

lemmonii
Flora of Arizona
Flora of New Mexico
North American desert flora
Flora of Mexico